Ioan Baba (November 25, 1951) is an ethnic Romanian Serbian poet, journalist, publicist, and translator.

In 2003, he became vice president of the Societății Române de Etnografie și Folclor in Voivodina.

Bibliography
 Popas în timp (1984)
 Preludiu imaginar (1988)
 În cuibul ochiului (1989)
 Oglinda triunghiulară (1990)
 Poeme incisive (1991)
 Năzbâtii candide (1994)
 Mărturisiri, confluențe (1997)
 Inscripție pe aer (1997)
 Compendiu biobliografic, Scriitori (1997)
 Cămașa de rigoare (1998)
 ReversAvers (1999)
 Lexiconul Artiștilor Plastici Români contemporani din Iugoslavia - vol I (1999)
 Cele mai frumoase poezii (2002)
 Poemele D (2002)
 Pe șevaletul orizontului (1986)
 Indiciul unității (1988)
 Antologia literaturii și artei din comunitățile românești vol I (1998)
 Laptele verde al câmpiei, 5 poeți din Voivodina (2001)
 Florilegiu basarabean (2002)
 Florilegiu bănățean (2002)
 Vremea creativității lui Slobodan Crnogorac (2003)

Translations
 Cerul din pahar (2002)

1951 births
Living people
People from Alibunar
Romanian poets
Romanian male poets
Romanian journalists
Romanian translators
Serbian people of Romanian descent